Meinu Ek Ladki Chaahiye is a 2014 Indian Hindi-language satirical film, starring Raghuvir Yadav, Puru Chibber, Reecha Sinha and Zakir Hussain. The film deals with the sensitive subject of rape cases. The backdrop of the film is a false rape case and the hero's fight for justice.

Plot
Meinu Ek Ladki Chaahiye is a comical satirical Hindi movie starring Raghubir Yadav, Puru Chibber, Reecha Sinha, Zakir Hussain, Yatin Karyekar & Rashee Bindal. Govind (Raghubir Yadav) & his assistant Shishupal (Puru Chibber) get their first legal case of firoz( irfan razaa khan)  after a lot of difficulties even though Govind's father is a renowned lawyer. Govind, a jovial person does everything that he can to save the accused. It's during the investigation that Govind and Shishupul come across some startling incidents. The case is of a serious nature but these two solve it in a very comical and hilarious way. However this case turns Govind's life upside down. Harassment by the police, getting locked up inside a jail, wife and daughter's hatred resulting in strained relations with them...Govind endures a lot. Even after all this, Govind is determined to find out the truth. This movie touches upon several issues in the country however in an entertaining manner. Since its Govind's first case, will he and his assistant manage to save the accused? And will the culprits be brought to the book? Meinu Ek Ladki Chaahiye will answer all these questions.

Cast

 Raghubir Yadav  as Govind Ji Hero
 Puru Chibber as Shishupal Romantic Hero
 Reecha Sinha as Deepa Heroine
 Zakir Hussain  as Lawyer Kharbanda
 Yatin Karyekar  as Shanti Bhushan
 Jyoti Gauba as Harshita (Govind Ji's wife)
 Rashee as Mishrita (Govind Ji's Daughter)
 Kashmira Kulkarni as Kamya
 Ahtesham Azad Khan as Kulbhushan
 Irfan Razaa Khan as Firoz
 Deepak Sinha as Inspector of Police [INS]
 Sanjay Verma as Police Constable [PC]
 Jay Yadav
 Khushboo Purohit as item number "Gori Chitti"
 Satya Prakash

Soundtrack

The album is compiled with songs of all kinds for every music lover. From a melodious sound track to a typical Punjabi song, Meinu Ek Ladki Chaahiye is a complete album. The biggest highlight of the album is an item number sung by Mamta Sharma of Munni Badnaam and Fevicol Se fame. Mamta has crooned on ‘Gori Chitti’ which has been specially composed by Shahdab Bhartiya while Sanjay Dhoopa Mishra is the lyricist.
 
Super-hit Mika Singh has sung Teri Toh Jhand and for the first time, audience will get to witness Raghubir Yadav's dancing abilities. Mesmerising Roop Kumar Rathod has voiced Nanhe Paon which beautifully emotes the unique relation between a parent and his daughter. There's also a romantic track featuring Puru Chibber and Reecha Sinha ‘Main Sifar’. Javed Ali is the voice behind this love song. Ravi Pawar is the composer of all the songs and Sanjay Dhoopa Mishra is the lyricist.

Reception

Meinu Ek Ladki Chaahiye received mixed reviews and has been appreciated for the content of the film. RJ Jeeturaj gave 2.5 stars while Bhavikk Sanghavi of planetbollywood.com gave 3 stars and said, "Raw. Real. Riveting. One of the most daring film of the year". Another website JustBollywood.com gave 3.5 stars and said, "A well timed movie and a beautiful satire which is worth watching considering the ace performance of Raghubir Yadav." Also Celebexplore.com given 2.5 Stars.
 
Filmytown gave 3 stars and said, "The movie touches upon several issues in the country however in an entertaining manner."

References

External links
 

2014 films
2010s Hindi-language films
2010s legal films
2010s satirical films
Indian crime comedy films
Indian satirical films
Legal drama films
Indian courtroom films